Kwame Blair Thomas (born 28 September 1995) is an English professional footballer who plays for Scottish Championship club Dundee, on loan from League Two club Sutton United.

A tall and physical player, he represented England at under-16, under-17 and under-20 level and was part of England's Under-20 Four Nations Tournament success in October 2014. At club level he came through the Derby County Academy to make his professional debut in the Championship in November 2014. He spent time on loan at Notts County and Blackpool, before leaving Derby for Coventry City in July 2016. He spent the first half of the 2016–17 season injured and Coventry went on to be relegated out of League One. He spent the next season on loan at National League sides Sutton United and Solihull Moors, before he was allowed to join Solihull on a permanent basis in February 2018. He was released by the Moors at the end of the 2018–19 campaign, following a brief loan spell at Kidderminster Harriers.

Club career

Derby County
Having made progress through Derby County academy following his two years as a scholar, Thomas signed his first professional contract in the summer of 2014, just months after receiving the club's Under-21s Player of the Year award. On 29 November 2014, Thomas made his debut as a 66th-minute substitute in a Championship defeat to Leeds United, missing a good chance to score with ten minutes left to play. On 12 January 2015, Thomas joined League One club Notts County on a one-month youth loan. On 20 January, he was sent off for a second bookable offence in a 0–0 draw at Doncaster Rovers after showing a delayed response to being substituted – "Magpies" manager Shaun Derry was also dismissed for protesting the decision; assistant manager Greg Abbott theorised that referee Richard Clark had not realised Thomas had already been booked when he initially showed the yellow card. He made his return to Derby after one month at Meadow Lane as "Rams" striker Chris Martin was injured and manager Steve McClaren needed cover up front.

On 29 July 2015, Thomas joined League One side Blackpool on a six-month loan deal. He made 22 appearances for the "Tangerines", which included six starts. He was recalled early from his loan in November, much to "Pool" manager Neil McDonald's disappointment, despite Thomas's failure to score at Bloomfield Road. Back with Derby he helped Rory Delap's under-21 side to win the 2015–16 Professional Development League 2 title, but left Pride Park after he was released in the summer.

Coventry City
On 1 July 2016, Thomas signed a two-year contract with Coventry City. Manager Tony Mowbray said that "he has a lot of assets and it's a question of moulding him in the right way because I think he's got the potential to be a really good footballer". However he was hit with an abdominal injury five minutes into his second substitute appearance for the "Sky Blues" and spent the next six months in recovery. He marked his recovery with his first goal for Russell Slade's side in a 3–2 defeat at Oldham Athletic on 11 February. Seven days later he proved to be a "revelation" after helping Coventry to record their first win in 16 games, as he and namesake George Thomas shared City's two goals in a 2–1 victory over Gillingham at the Ricoh Arena. He ended the 2016–17 season with three goals in 14 games as Coventry were relegated out of League One.

Having struggled again with injury problems in the 2017–18 pre-season, he found himself low down on new manager Mark Robins's pecking order following the arrivals of Duckens Nazon and Tony Andreu, and was limited to a single start in the EFL Trophy. Robins said that "he has got to go out and try to get some football because his history at the moment is he hasn't played enough games and he breaks down with injuries". On 8 September, he joined National League side Sutton United on a one-month loan deal. However the loan spell at Gander Green Lane was described as a "disappointing" one as he was limited to just two league starts, featuring in the full 90 minutes only once.

Solihull Moors
Thomas returned to the National League on a one-month loan at Solihull Moors on 17 November 2017. He scored on his Moors debut on 18 November, to salvage a 1–1 draw at Maidstone United in Mark Yates's first game as manager; assistant manager Tim Flowers said that Thomas was "unplayable" and well worthy of his one-yard tap-in goal. The loan deal was extended by a further month on 5 January. He left Coventry after his contract was terminated by mutual consent on 1 February 2018. He made an immediate return to Damson Park and ended the 2017–18 campaign with four goals in 27 appearances for Solihull.

He failed to score in 19 matches throughout the 2018–19 campaign and was sent off during a 5–0 win over Bromley on 22 September. On 15 March, he joined National League North side Kidderminster Harriers on loan. He started one game for the Harriers, making four further substitute appearances, before being recalled early from his loan spell at Aggborough by Solihull manager Tim Flowers. He left the club upon the expiry of his contract in the summer.

Doncaster Rovers
After having trials at Port Vale and Carlisle United in July 2019, Thomas was signed by Doncaster Rovers on 4 October 2019 on a short-term contract till January 2020. On 22 October 2019 he scored his first two goals for the club in a 1–7 win over Southend.

Burton Albion

On 4 February 2020, Thomas signed for Burton Albion on a six-month deal.

Wrexham
Kwame signed for Wrexham on 29th August 2020 on a one-year deal.
After a ruptured achilles injury ended his 2020/2021 season, he was retained by Wrexham who stood by Thomas with another one-year deal. He returned in mid-December 2021, scoring on his return.

Sutton United
On 1 July 2022, Thomas joined League Two club Sutton United following his release from Wrexham, returning to the club having played four matches on loan in 2017.

Dundee (loan) 
On 19 January 2023, Thomas joined Scottish Championship club Dundee on loan until the end of the season. He would make his debut for the Dark Blues coming off the bench against St Mirren in the Scottish Cup. On 17 February, Thomas suffered a potential concussion in a league game against Greenock Morton. Fortunately he was able to be in the line-up the following week.

International career
Born in England, Thomas is of Ghanaian descent. Thomas has represented England at under-16, under-17, and under-20 levels. He scored two goals for the under-20s, in friendlies against Romania and the United States. He played in all three of England's games in the Under-20 Four Nations Tournament in October 2014, which England won after finishing ahead of Germany, Netherlands and Turkey. He was named in Aidy Boothroyd's squad for the 2015 Toulon Tournament in France and was an unused substitute up until the third-place play-off match at Stade Mayol, which he started; England finished fourth after losing 2–1 to the United States.

Style of play
A powerful forward, he is a threat in the air and on the ground. Former Derby youth coach Darren Wassall described him as a "model professional". Before being released by Coventry, Academy coach Jason Farndon said that "his physicality has always been his main threat but now everyone is catching up with his physicality so he has got to reinvent himself."

Personal life
Thomas grew up supporting Arsenal and idolizing Thierry Henry. He is a devout Christian. He went to school with Offrande Zanzala and the two remained good friends into adulthood.

Career statistics

Honours
England U20
Under-20 Four Nations Tournament: October 2014

References

Living people
1995 births
English footballers
English people of Ghanaian descent
Black British sportspeople
Footballers from Nottingham
People from Nottingham
English Christians
England youth international footballers
Association football forwards
Derby County F.C. players
Notts County F.C. players
Blackpool F.C. players
Coventry City F.C. players
Sutton United F.C. players
Solihull Moors F.C. players
Kidderminster Harriers F.C. players
Doncaster Rovers F.C. players
Burton Albion F.C. players
Wrexham A.F.C. players
English Football League players
National League (English football) players
Dundee F.C. players
Scottish Professional Football League players